Anna Lucz (born 14 April 1999) is a Hungarian sprint canoeist.

She won a medal at the 2019 ICF Canoe Sprint World Championships.

References

External links

1999 births
Living people
Hungarian female canoeists
ICF Canoe Sprint World Championships medalists in kayak
Canoeists from Budapest
European Games competitors for Hungary
Canoeists at the 2019 European Games
20th-century Hungarian women
21st-century Hungarian women